The 11th Artistic Gymnastics World Championships were held in Prague, Czechoslovakia, in 1938.

Medals

Men

Team final

All-around 
A total of 60 competitors were individually ranked in the all-around competition.

Floor exercise

Pommel horse

Rings

Vault

Parallel bars

Horizontal bar

Women

Team final

All-around 
A total of 32 woman gymnasts were individually ranked for the all-around competition.
With the context of both the previous World Championships which were the first with a women's segment to the competition as well as the interceding Olympic Games, the outcome and composition of the women's all-around podium at these championships was significant.  Reportedly, cheating occurred at the first 1934 women's installment of these games which, when undone, allowed the Czechoslovakian team and their foremost star Vlasta Děkanová to be the first-place finishers, as a team and individual, respectively.  Going into the 1936 Olympics, the Czechoslovakians and Děkanová were the favorites, but had to take 2nd place behind the home-ground advantaged German team (who did not compete at the 1934 Worlds), and the top three scoring individuals were all German.  These 1938 Worlds were hosted in Prague, Czechoslovakia, and this time all three spots on the all-around podium were occupied by individuals from the Czechoslovakian team.  Děkanová (a Bohemian) successfully defended her first place finish from the previous worlds, Zdeňka Veřmiřovská (a Moravian) won silver, and Matylda Pálfyová (a Slovakian) won bronze.  The three regions from which each hailed within the former Czechoslovakia were the 3 largest and most significant regions of that nation, so the fullest representation possible of geographical diversity within that country was made manifest on this all-around podium.

Vault

Parallel bars 

As of 1938, women sometimes still performed on the parallel bars, which are now exclusive to men in competition, rather than the uneven bars, which are now exclusive to women in competition.

Balance beam

Floor exercise

References

Sports123

World Artistic Gymnastics Championships
World Artistic Gymnastics Championships, 1938
Gym
International gymnastics competitions hosted by Czechoslovakia